2006 World Championships may refer to:

 Aquatics: 2006 FINA Short Course World Championships
 Athletics: 2006 IAAF World Indoor Championships
Cross-country running: 2006 IAAF World Cross Country Championships
Road running: 2006 IAAF World Road Running Championships
Paralympics: 2006 IPC Athletics World Championships
 Badminton: 2006 IBF World Championships
 Bandy: Bandy World Championship 2006
 Basketball: 2006 FIBA World Championship
 Chess: FIDE World Chess Championship 2006
 Curling:
 2006 World Men's Curling Championship
 2006 World Women's Curling Championship
 Darts:
 2006 PDC World Darts Championship
 2006 BDO World Darts Championship
 Fencing: 2006 World Fencing Championships
 Figure skating: 2006 World Figure Skating Championships
 Ice hockey: 2006 Men's World Ice Hockey Championships
 Ice hockey: 2006 Women's World Ice Hockey Championships
 Speed skating:
Allround: 2006 World Allround Speed Skating Championships
Sprint: 2006 World Sprint Speed Skating Championships
 Weightlifting: 2006 World Weightlifting Championships
 Volleyball: 2006 FIVB Men's World Championship

See also
 2006 World Cup (disambiguation)
 2006 Continental Championships (disambiguation)
 2006 World Junior Championships (disambiguation)